is a Japanese retired goalball player. She won a bronze medal at the 2004 Summer Paralympics.

References 

Paralympic bronze medalists for Japan
Goalball players at the 2004 Summer Paralympics
Sportspeople from Gunma Prefecture
1971 births
Living people
Medalists at the 2004 Summer Paralympics
Paralympic goalball players of Japan
Female goalball players
People from Kiryū, Gunma
Paralympic medalists in goalball
21st-century Japanese women